Hatun Wasi (Quechua: hatun big (in Bolivia always jatun), wasi house, "big house", also spelled Jatun Huasi) is a mountain in Peru which reaches a height of approximately . It is located in the Apurímac Region, Andahuaylas Province, on the border of the districts of Chicmo District and Huancaray.

References

Mountains of Peru
Mountains of Apurímac Region